Voices of Sarafina! is a 1988 American documentary film about the anti-apartheid musical stage play Sarafina! directed by Nigel Noble. It was screened in the Un Certain Regard section at the 1989 Cannes Film Festival.

Cast
 Leleti Khumalo as Sarafina
 Baby Cele as Mistress Itsapity
 Pat Mlaba as Colgate
 Miriam Makeba as Herself
 Mary Twala as Sarafina's Grandmother
 Mbongeni Ngema as Sabela

References

External links

1988 films
American documentary films
Films directed by Nigel Noble
Documentary films about theatre
Documentary films about apartheid
1980s English-language films
1980s American films